A pilar sheath acanthoma is a cutaneous condition most often found on the face, particularly above the upper lip in adults.

See also 
 Dilated pore
 Trichoadenoma
 Skin lesion

References 

Epidermal nevi, neoplasms, and cysts